John Daniel Mallee (pronounced "MAY lee"; born May 5, 1969) is an American professional baseball coach, and former Minor League Baseball (MiLB) player. He is current the hitting coach for the Iowa Cubs of Minor League Baseball (MiLB). As a MiLB player, Mallee was a shortstop and second baseman. He has previously been the hitting coach of the Florida Marlins, Houston Astros, Chicago Cubs, and Philadelphia Phillies.

Early and personal life 

Mallee was born in Chicago, Illinois. He attended Chicago State University and the University of Illinois at Chicago, where he majored in kinesiology.

He married Candy Wiedeman in 1995, and has two sons, John III and Austin.

Baseball career

Playing career
Mallee was drafted by the Philadelphia Phillies in the 10th round of the 1991 amateur draft, out of University of Illinois. He played in minor league baseball from 1991 to 1992 in the Philadelphia Phillies minor league system, for Rookie League Martinsville (1991) and Single-A Spartanburg (1992). Mallee hit .208/.313/.257 with 8 stolen bases  and 28 RBI in 115 career minor league games, playing 95 games at shortstop and 20 games at second base.

Coaching career
He began his coaching career with Milwaukee as the hitting coach for Beloit (A, 1996-97; 99), Stockton (A, 1998), and Huntsville (AA, 2000). He was then the minor league hitting coach for the Montreal Expos at Ottawa (AAA, 2001).

He then served as the Florida Marlins minor league hitting coordinator for nine seasons, from 2002-2010, and their major league hitting coach from 2010-11.

On October 19, 2012, the Astros announced that Mallee would be their hitting coach for 2012, working under Bo Porter. He was their major league hitting coach from 2013-14.

On October 9, 2014, he was named by the Chicago Cubs as their major league hitting coach, succeeding Bill Mueller. On October 26, 2017, the Cubs announced that Mallee had been released from his contract and Chili Davis was named as his replacement.

On November 10, 2017, he was hired as the hitting coach of the Philadelphia Phillies under manager Gabe Kapler. On August 13, 2019, after a slump in which the Phillies fell from first place to fourth place in the NL East, he was replaced by former Phillies manager Charlie Manuel. 

He was hired by the Los Angeles Angels as their assistant hitting coach prior to the 2020 season. Following the 2022 season, the Angels stated that Mallee would not be returning to a coaching position with the team.

References

External links 

1969 births
Living people
Sportspeople from Chicago
Baseball coaches from Illinois
Baseball players from Chicago
Baseball shortstops
Chicago Cubs coaches
Florida Marlins coaches
Houston Astros coaches
Los Angeles Angels coaches
Major League Baseball hitting coaches
Martinsville Phillies players
Minor league baseball coaches
Philadelphia Phillies coaches
Spartanburg Phillies players
UIC Flames baseball players